Berberis moranensis is a shrub in the genus Berberis in the family Berberidaceae. Because of its compound leaves, some botanists place it in the genus Mahonia. It is native to forested regions of the mountains of Mexico from Sinaloa and Guanajuato to Oaxaca. Berberis moranensis has thick waxy leaves, yellow flowers, and purple berries. This species is closely related to Berberis pimana J.E. Laferr. & J.S. Marr.

References

moranensis
Flora of Mexico
Plants described in 1829